Claremont Canyon Regional Preserve  is a small regional park mainly located in the city of Oakland, California, and administered by the East Bay Regional Park District.  The park is named for the canyon in which it is situated, Claremont Canyon, out of which Claremont Creek flows on its way to its confluence with Temescal Creek. Originally, the canyon was named Harwood's Canyon, and then later as Telegraph Canyon. The name was changed to Claremont by a developer of the nearby Claremont district.

History
The land now called Claremont Canyon was part of an 1820 Spanish land grant called Rancho San Antonio. It was later used as a transportation route by Americans from the eastern United States who wished to settle in the area that had been dubbed California. In 1858, a transcontinental telegraph line was built through the canyon. Starting in the 1860s, the "Pony Express" carried mail through the canyon to and from the Eastern part of the United States.

EBRPD first bought an  parcel of surplus state land east of the U.C. Berkeley campus in 1978. Then it acquired some more acreage in the immediate area from several individuals. Finally, it bought a  parcel in Gwin Canyon. These acquisitions were combined to become Claremont Canyon Regional Preserve.

General description
It rises from a height of about 420 ft (130 m) above sea level, just behind the Clark Kerr campus of the University of California, Berkeley to the average 1300 ft (400 m) ridge of the East Bay hills, linking by way of other conserved land belonging to the University and the East Bay Municipal Utility District to other parks such as Tilden Regional Park and Sibley Volcanic Regional Preserve. It thus offers direct pedestrian access to the park system, with connections to public transportation, from the lower-lying residential areas of Berkeley and Oakland.

Plant Communities 
Claremont Canyon contains a variety of plant communities, both native and introduced. Coastal scrub is an important part of the preserve, housing coyote brush, French broom, lupine, monkeyflower brush, and California coastal sagebrush.  Redwood groves can also be found in the canyon, containing both older and recently planted trees.  Eucalyptus stands have been planted in the area throughout the years, though many local residents now are concerned they may pose a fire hazard.

Activities
The Preserve is relatively undeveloped and offers almost no amenities to visitors other than two hiking trails: Stonewall Panoramic Trail and Gwin Canyon Trail.

Stonewall Panoramic Trail
The Stonewall Panoramic Trail begins at a parking area on Stonewall Road, behind the historic Claremont Hotel.
The steep path up to the ridge gives splendid views across the cities of Berkeley and Oakland, and beyond to San Francisco Bay, the Golden Gate Bridge and San Francisco. On clear days, especially in winter, the Farallon Islands, about 44 miles (70 km) away, can be seen beyond the Golden Gate.

Gwin Canyon Trail
Within the Preserve is a side canyon called Gwin Canyon with a  trail accessible from the end of Norfolk Road near Strathmoor Drive in the Oakland Hills. The trail ends just above Claremont Creek,   from the trailhead.

While the upper reaches of Claremont Canyon are technically outside the Preserve, there are an additional  of open space contiguous to it owned and managed by the University of California.  A local non-profit citizens' organization, the Claremont Canyon Conservancy, works with the public landowners offering stewardship services and educational programs.

Access
There is very little public parking available either within or very near the Preserve. Street parking is prohibited. Visitors are encouraged to use mass transit to reach the UC Berkeley campus, then enter the Preserve by hiking.

See also
Claremont Shale — Miocene epoch geologic formation in area.
Claremont, Oakland/Berkeley, California

References

External links
 Claremont Canyon Regional Reserve official web page

East Bay Regional Park District
Parks in Oakland, California
Berkeley Hills